Coli may refer to:
 Places
 Coli, Emilia-Romagna, a comune in the Province of Piacenza in Italy
 Coli Toro Formation, a Mesozoic geologic formation

 People
 Claudia Coli, a French actress in the 2005 Gabrielle film
 Eco James Coli (1922-1982), a Chicago tough guy who was an alleged labor racketeer
 François Coli (1881–1927), a French pilot and navigator
 Giovanni Coli (1636–1691), an Italian painter from Lucca active in the Baroque style

 Anatomy / medicine / biology
 Fascia coli a synonym for the deep cervical fascia, muscles in the neck
Coli can refer to the colon in Latin in several diseases and species names :
 Escherichia coli, a type of Coliform bacteria normally present in the intestine 
 Adenomatosis polyposis coli, a protein that in humans is encoded by the APC gene
 Melanosis coli, a disorder of pigmentation of the wall of the colon
 Taenia coli, three separate longitudinal ribbons of smooth muscle

See also 
 COLI (disambiguation)